Piduguralla is a town in Palnadu district of the Indian state of Andhra Pradesh.The town is the headquarters of Piduguralla mandal and administered under Gurazala revenue division. The town is also known as Lime City of India  as there are abundant reserves of limestone.

Governance 

Civic administration

Politics

Piduguralla is a part of Gurazala (Assembly constituency) for Andhra Pradesh Legislative Assembly. Kasu Mahesh Reddy is the present MLA of the constituency from YSR Congress Party. It is also a part of Narasaraopet (Lok Sabha constituency) which was won by Lavu Sri Krishna Devarayalu of YSR Congress Party.

Economy 
Agriculture

Most of the people here depend on agriculture with fertile lands having abundant water from the Nagarjunasagar canals.

The major agriculture produce includes, paddy, cotton, chillies etc. Hence, the town has many rice and cotton mills.

Industries

There are many Limestone Kilns as well. So, one of the main professions of the people is quarrying and exporting limestone and white cement in Piduguralla.

Business is not restricted to lime stone only; there are several other industries like Timber depots, Hollow brick industries, Computer Institutions, Photo studios, Printing presses, Hand embroidery, Fancy stores, Stationary shops, Pharmacies etc. Overall it is one of the most important business places in Guntur district.

The town also has big companies' branches like Reliance Digital, Reliance Trends. It also has companies like Surya Cement, T&D Group Pvt Ltd (under which it has T&D Minerals and T&D Future Kids) etc.

Transport 

National Highway 167A (NH167A) passes through Piduguralla. It is well connected by buses for Hyderabad, Chennai, Bengaluru, Tirupati, Nellore, Guntur, Amaravati, Vijayawada, Tenali, Narasaraopet, Macherla, Repalle, Warangal, Suryapet, Kodad, Sattenapalli and  Ongole. It has a well established bus depot that connects villages around the town. The bus station code is PDRL.

Trains from/to Guntur, Vijayawada, Vizag, Hyderabad, Chennai, Tirupathi, Kerala, and Kolkata pass via Piduguralla. Later, Guntur-Nadikudi-Macherla line was converted from Meter Gauge to Broad Gauge [under Project Unigauge] and a new line was laid from Bibinagar, near Hyderabad, to Nadikudi. Thus Piduguralla is connected directly to Hyderabad by Broad Gauge Line. Piduguralla is located on the Pagidipalle-Nallapadu section Guntur division of South Central Railway (SCR). The railway Station code for Piduguralla is PGRL.

The railway line is an electrified single line one and a new railway track (Nadikudi-Srikalahasti) is under construction. In first phase of Nadikudi-Srikalahasti 46 km From New Piduguralla Junction to Savalyapuram was completed. Electrification proposal is also under progress.

Education
The primary and secondary school education is imparted by government, aided and private schools, under the School Education Department of the state. The medium of instruction followed by different schools are English, Telugu.

References 

Towns in Guntur district
Mandal headquarters in Guntur district